Charles Hamar Delevingne (born 25 June 1949) is an English property developer and the father of Cara and Poppy Delevingne. He is the son of socialite Angela Delevingne and the grandson of the lawyer and politician The 1st Viscount Greenwood.

Early life
Charles Delevingne was born on 25 June 1949 to Edward Dudley Delevingne, born in Wandsworth, London, a British stockbroker and ex-husband of Countess Felicia Gizycki (daughter of American publishing heiress Cissy Patterson), and second wife The Honourable Angela Margo Hamar Greenwood. His maternal grandparents were The 1st Viscount Greenwood, the politician, and his wife Margery Spencer. He was educated at Embley Park school. He was described as a "debs' delight" in his youth.

Career
Delevingne is a successful property developer with holdings in the Brompton Cross area. He founded Harvey White Properties Limited and has been a partner in a number of estate agencies. He is a director of The Ultimate Travel Company and a non-executive director of Wynnstay Properties plc.

Family
Delevingne is married to Pandora Anne Stevens (born 1959), daughter of Sir Jocelyn Edward Greville Stevens and his wife, Jane Armyne Sheffield of the Sheffield baronets. Pandora is a personal shopper for Selfridges. They have three daughters, Chloe, Poppy and Cara. He also has an older son, Alexander, from a previous relationship. Delevingne's paternal aunt, Doris Delevingne, was the first wife of Valentine, Viscount Castlerosse.

References 

Living people
1949 births
English businesspeople
Charles